"Somewhere Between Right and Wrong" is a song written and recorded by American country music artist Earl Thomas Conley. It was released in September 1982 as the second single and title track from the album Somewhere Between Right and Wrong. The song was Conley's second number one on the country charts.  The single went to number one for one week and spent a total of thirteen weeks on the country chart.

Charts

References
 

1982 singles
1982 songs
Earl Thomas Conley songs
Songs written by Earl Thomas Conley
RCA Records singles